John Skirving Ewart,  (August 11, 1849February 21, 1933) was a Canadian lawyer and author best known as an advocate for the independence of Canada.

Ewart was born in Toronto, Ontario, on August 11, 1849, to Thomas Ewart and Catherine Seaton Skirving. His grandfather was Toronto architect John Ewart, and his uncle Sir Oliver Mowat. He married Jessie Campbell in 1873.

He was educated at Upper Canada College and Osgoode Hall Law School, and was called to the bar in 1871 (Q.C., 1884). His legal career spanned work in Toronto, Winnipeg and Ottawa. He was the author of many essays and articles, and a passionate advocate for the independence of Canada.

He died in Ottawa and is buried at Beechwood Cemetery.

Published works 
 The Kingdom of Canada: Imperial Federation, The Colonial Conferences, The Alaska Boundary, and Other Essays (Toronto, 1908)
 John A. Macdonald and the Canadian Flag (Toronto, 1908)
 Canadian Independence (Toronto, 1911)
Waiver Distributed Among the Departments: Election, Estoppel, Contract, Release (Cambridge, 1917)
 The Roots and Causes of the Wars (1914-1918) (2 vols., New York, 1925)
 Two series of brochures:
 The Kingdom Papers, nos. 1-19 (Ottawa, 1911-4)
 The Independence Papers (Ottawa, 2 vols., 1925–30).

References

External links 
 John S. Ewart, Quebec History

1849 births
1933 deaths
Canadian lawyers
Canadian male non-fiction writers
Canadian King's Counsel
People from Old Toronto
Persons of National Historic Significance (Canada)
Writers from Toronto
York University alumni